Drosophila affinis is a species of vinegar fly in the Drosophila obscura species group. Alongside other Obscura group species (e.g. Drosophila pseudoobscura), Drosophila affinis is used to study chromosome evolution and speciation.

Gallery

References 

affinis